"Gun Has No Trigger" is a song by the American experimental rock group Dirty Projectors from their seventh album, Swing Lo Magellan. It was written and produced by David Longstreth, who also directed the accompanying music video. The song was released digitally on March 30, 2012, and on CD and vinyl on July 10, 2012.

Reception
Nick Neyland wrote a positive review of the song for Pitchfork, concluding that "...it’s through a brilliant kind of simplicity that all the parts of "Gun Has No Trigger" come together". Spin described "Gun Has No Trigger" as "a sonic breath of fresh air".

References

External links

2012 singles
Domino Recording Company singles
Dirty Projectors songs
2012 songs
Song recordings produced by Dave Longstreth